Lytton Indian Band may refer to:

Lytton Band of Pomo Indians (California)
Lytton First Nation (British Columbia)